Golo is an unincorporated community in Graves County, Kentucky, United States.

Notable people
United States Army General Carlos Brewer was born in Golo.

Notes

Unincorporated communities in Graves County, Kentucky
Unincorporated communities in Kentucky